Cornelius Desmond (died 31 October 1974) was an Irish politician and trade union official. He was a Labour Party member of Seanad Éireann from 1961 to 1965. He was elected to the 10th Seanad in 1961 by the Administrative Panel. He lost his seat at the 1965 Seanad election. He was an unsuccessful candidate a by-election on 2 August 1956 for the Cork Borough constituency.

References

Year of birth missing
1974 deaths
Labour Party (Ireland) senators
Members of the 10th Seanad
Irish trade unionists
People from Cork (city)